Iriga, officially the City of Iriga (Rinconada Bikol: Syudad ka Iriga;), is component city in the province of Camarines Sur, Philippines. According to the 2020 census, it has a population of 114,457 people.

History 

Barely half a century after Ferdinand Magellan discovered the Philippines on March 16, 1521, Iriga, now a city, was only a visita of Nabua, Provincia de Ambos Camarines. Because of the disastrous floods that occur during rainy seasons in suburban Poblacion of Nabua, Father Felix de Huertas, the then parish priest, advised the farmers to move to I-raga (donde hay tierra or where there is land) where they can plant their crops without fear of being flooded. The flood victims of Nabua who moved earlier and followed the suggestions of their parish priest were the fortunate beneficiaries of the harvest of their agricultural plantation coming from the rich and fertile soils of I-raga, more so, those who planted at the foot of Sumagang Mountain (Mountain of the Rising Sun, now Mt. Iriga) said to be nature's given symbol of the Irigueños lofty ideals and noble visions.

As population spread out and evangelization progressed, the settlement at the foot of Sumagang Mountain developed in size and wealth, slowly pushing the aborigines (Agta) up to the thickness of the forest. And in 1578 the I-raga settlement was established as “visita” of Nabua under Fray Pablo de Jesus and Fray Bartolome Ruiz, both Franciscans. Three decades later or on January 4, 1641, Mount Asog (named after a negrito chieftain who ruled the aborigines) or Mt. Iriga, erupted. That eruption brought much fear to the settlers but with their strong faith and belief a miracle happened and as witnessed by local folks, the apparition of the Blessed Virgin Mother and her son Lord Jesus or “Nuestra Señora de Angustia” at sitio Inorogan saved the people from terrible earthquake and flood. The eruption formed the cavernous gully on the side of Buhi leading to the steep gorge which was the crater of the “volcano”.

Iriga, according to Fray Felix Huertas in his lengthily-titled Estado Geografico, Topografico, Estadisticdo, Historico-Reliogoso de la Santa Apostolica Provincia de S. Gregorio Magno published in 1865, came from the native word iraga, which means “poseedores de mucho terreno,” or “possessors of much land.” From a mere “doctrina,” a religious administrative word which roughly means a “mission post” in 1583. In 1683, this progressive visita of I-raga was converted into Pueblo de la Provincia de Ambos Camarines with a population of 8,908 which several decades later the name I-raga was changed to Iriga by the Spanish authorities and advocated St. Anthony of Padua as Patron Saint and June 13 as the annual fiesta.

From the middle of the 19th century until the first two decades of the 20th century, Iriga was a major abaca-producing town in the Bicol region, largely because of the rich volcanic soil surrounding Mt. Iriga which it spewed in its last eruption about six hundred years before the coming of the Spaniards in Bikol. According to William Freer, the American Superintendent of Schools in Camarines Sur, “The sides of the mountain nourish rich plantations of abaca owned by several Spaniards, and shelter several hundreds of the Philippine aborigines, the Negritos, who are now employed on the plantations. Because of the production of abaca the town of Iriga ranks third in importance in Camarines, being outclassed only by Nueva Caceres and Daet.”

During the incumbency of Don Martin Mendoza as Capitan Municipal, in the memorias de la Provincia de Ambos Camarines, showed that the “Pueblo de Iriga” was composed of “barrios y visitas distinguida la poblacion centro del casco en 5 barrios que son San Roque, San Francisco de Asis, San Juan Bautista, Santo Domingo de Guzman y San Miguel Arcangel con 6 visitas fuera del casco denominados San Nicolas de Tolentino, San Agustin, San Antonio Abad, Santo Niño, Santiago de Galicia y la visita de los monteses” with a population of 13,813. There were only four roads mentioned, they were coming from Nabua going to Baao, to Buhi and to Polangui, Albay, now the diversion road passing Salvacion, Masoli, Bato, then to the south road going to Polangui, Albay and there was only one way going to Nueva Caceres (Naga) via Bicol River by boat.

In 1913, the Manila Railroad (MRR) Company Station and the public market were established in their respective present site which readily contributed to the rapid growth of Iriga making it the center of trade and commerce in Rinconada area. It was also at this time that Mondays and Thursdays were declared as market days in Iriga. The Municipality of Iriga continued to prosper through the years. The original “barrios y visitas” have developed sitios which later on, these sitios have metamorphosed into distinct and separate barrios. After the Second World War, San Ramon, San Rafael, Cristo Rey, Santa Isabel, San Vicente Norte, San Andres, Santa Teresita, Perpetual Help, Sagrada, Niño Jesus, San Pedro and Antipolo, former sitios of barrio San Agustin, San Isidro and San Nicolas were created as barrios. And, the barrios of La Anunciacion and Santa Elena were sitios of Santo Domingo and Santiago, Del Rosario (Banao) of Santiago and Santo Niño and La Purisima of San Francisco & part of Santo Domingo, Santa Cruz Sur of San Francisco. Francia and San Jose from San Miguel and San Vicente Sur, Salvacion, La Trinidad and La Medalla from the large barrio of San Antonio. Some of these barrios were already created during the incumbency of Mayor Jose C. Villanueva in 1960. And the latest and the 36th barrio ever created was Santa Maria which comprises the sitios of Tubigan, Katungdulan, Bagacay, Sampaga, Rao and Cawayan of barrio Santa Teresita by virtue of Republic Act 6228.

Cityhood 

Through the unflinching support and willful cooperation of the town's people, Mayor Jose C. Villanueva at the helm of stewardship successfully gained the conversion of Iriga into the signing of R.A 5261 otherwise known as the Charter of Iriga City on July 8, 1968. The city, however, was formally organized and inaugurated as the third city of Bicol on September 3, 1968, by Presidential Proclamation and officiated by the President of the Philippines. Since then, Iriga City has developed tremendously making it not only as the center of trade and commerce in Rinconada area but the whole Bicol Region as well, as it is strategically located in between the cities of Naga and Legazpi.

Present 
In 2004, Madelaine Alfelor-Gazmen, the daughter of the late Camarines Sur congressman, Ciriaco R. Alfelor and granddaughter of Camarines Sur Governor Felix O. Alfelor, became Iriga's first woman city mayor, and only the third city mayor after his uncle, Emmanuel R. Alfelor was similarly elected in 1994 and served the city for 3 consecutive terms (1994-2004). On May 9, 2016, Iriga produced its first and only senator of the Republic through the successful ascension of senator and human rights defender Leila de Lima in the Philippine Senate.

Geography 
Iriga is bounded by the town of Buhi in the east, by the municipalities of Baao, Nabua and Bato in the west, by the province of Albay in the south, and by the municipalities of Ocampo and Sangay in the north.

Barangays 
Iriga City is politically subdivided into 36 barangays.

Climate

Demographics 

Language 
Irigueños or people of Iriga speak Rinconada Bikol. Irigueños of Austronesian lineage use the Iriga variant while the indigenous and aboriginal groups of Agta or Negritos use the Agta variant of the language. Filipino and English are also understood and spoken because they are taught in the education system. Bikol Central is also commonly understood and spoken in the Rinconada area as it is used by the Catholic church and the local TV station centered at Naga.

Religion 
The majority of the city residents are Roman Catholic. The Archdiocese of Caceres has several parishes and churches in the city. The biggest church can be found at the center of the city (Saint Anthony of Padua) and the Lourdes grotto symbolizes the long history of Catholicism in Iriga. Tinagba, a harvest festival can be seen a fusion of folk tradition and Catholic saint celebration.

Iglesia ni Cristo is the largest minority religion in the city. The INC's district office of ecclesiastical district of Camarines Southeast (CSE) is located in Barangay San Nicolas. The office oversees the church members in Rinconada and Partido areas in Camarines Sur, and Burias island in Masbate. Thus, a large number of INC members can be found in the city. At present, Iglesia ni Cristo has four local congregations and two extensions in Iriga.

Islam is a new religion in the city and most of its members are immigrants from Mindanao island. LDS Church members are also numerous, as well as Jehovah's Witnesses. Baptist adherents are also active in the city.

Economy 

Iriga is the 4th largest economy in the entire Bicol region, and May soon become a Major Economic hub in the future.

Iriga City Public Market is one of the busiest in the region which makes the city as the center of commerce in Rinconada district. The old Public Market was redesigned and reconstructed in 2010 and now hosts LCC supermarket, many local shops and several national chain restaurants. Sold at the new public market are locally grown and harvested organic produce such as tilapia harvested from nearby Lake Buhi and Lake Bato. Salt water fresh and dried fish from neighboring Balatan coast are sold in abundance in the market. Gift shops offering locally manufactured products made from local hemp, pili nut, bamboo and coconut are offered to local and foreign tourists.

The city is home to three major commercial complexes namely the LCC Mall Iriga, which was the second LCC Mall in the district, the UNP Town Mall near the University of Northeastern Philippines, Regent Central Commercial Complex and the newly built Gaisano Capital Iriga. National chain restaurants like Mang Inasal, Chowking, Jollibee, Biggs and Shakey's opened branches in the city. Many other fastfood and specialty restaurants are planning to open branches in the future including KFC and 1st Colonial Grill, that are planned to open at around 2019 at the Gaisano Capital Iriga . A new convention center was built in front of the Catholic Grotto hosts important events in the city.

Shopping malls

There are two shopping malls in the City of Iriga. LCC Mall Iriga which is the largest commercial shopping center in the entire Rinconada area and Gaisano mall which is the 2nd biggest after LCC mall has many fast food chains.

Tourism 

Found at the downtown Iriga is the City Park which is located near the cathedral and across the old City Hall. It is a well landscaped, Japanese-themed park with a huge spurting fountain at the center but was later replaced with a skating rink. Acacia trees are lit with colored lights during Christmas season. Surrounding the park are business establishments and landmarks such as the Lourdes Grotto which offers a great view of the downtown.

There is a number of waterfalls and springs found in the city. Several resorts and hotels were built to accommodate growing tourist arrivals. The old Ibalon Hotel was renovated and renamed as Iriga City Plaza Hotel. Local cuisine offering meat and vegetarian dishes with coconut milk and red chili peppers.

Infrastructure 
A small central bus terminal was constructed in the city center to accommodate buses, shuttles and jeepneys going to Manila and neighboring cities. Philippine National Railways and Philippine Transportation Company (PHILTRANCO) maintain stations in Iriga City. Several hospitals operate in the city. A catholic-convent run Santa Maria Josefa Hospital is well- equipped and among the best in the region.

Energy 
Power is supplied by the Camarines Sur Electric Cooperative (CASURECO) III. Electrification of far villages in the mountain and river districts was completed and now, the city is 100% electrified.

Telecommunications 
Iriga City is served with several nationally operating telecom companies namely Converge ICT, Bayantel, PLDT, Smart, Globe and Dito which offer telephone and internet services. These companies maintain major operations in the city.  Iriga City is also the regional base of operations of TV and radio network RPN (Radio Philippines Network) Channel 9. Since 1968, its radio station RPN DZKI-AM (Radyo Ronda Iriga) and television station RPN DWKI-TV 10 (currently airing CNN Philippines) which has been operating from the city has dominated the airwaves.  There are a few local cable TV operators that dominate the cable TV market, including GMA TV 13 Iriga (affiliated to DZAL of Rinconada Broadcasting Corp.) ABS-CBN Corporation has proposed to construct a relay station in the city, probably on a UHF channel, while TV5 planned to set up a 10 KW UHF relay station here. DZIJ-RJTV Channel 21 is set to open in the city.

Education 

The city is home to two universities, several colleges and trade schools. The University of Saint Anthony, University of Northeastern Philippines, La Consolacion College, STI College, AMA Computer Learning Center and many others are located right within the city proper. These schools have students from the city and nearby towns. The city is host to a big number of student migrants from the region.

Government

List of former chief executives

CAPITAN MUNICIPAL
 Don Felipe Monponbanua
(1898-1899)

PRESIDENTE MUNICIPAL
 Don Felipe Monponbanua
(1899-1900)
 Don Eulogio Mirando
(1923-1928)
Don Santiago Gonzales
(1929-1937)

MUNICIPAL MAYORS
Felix Alfelor, Sr.
(1938-1940)
Don Felix Monte
(1948-1951)
Don Santiago Ortega, Sr.
(1952-1955)
Perfecto Taduran
(1956-1959)
Jose C. Villanueva
(1960-1967)

CITY MAYORS
Jose C. Vilanueva
(1968-1980; March 1, 1988 – June 30, 1995)
Politico R. Corporal
(OIC - April 1980-Nov. 1986)
Salvador de Lima
(OIC - Dec. 1986-Nov. 1987)
Regino A. Revina
(OIC - Dec. 1987-March 1988)
Emmanuel R. Alfelor
(July 1, 1995 – June 30, 2004)
Madelaine Y. Alfelor 
(July 1, 2004 – June 30, 2013,
July 1, 2016 – June 30, 2019)
Ronald Felix Y. Alfelor
(July 1, 2013 – June 30, 2016)

Notable Irigueño 
The Iriga produced prominent personalities in different areas and careers which can be culled as follows; 

 Former Sen. Leila M. Delima￼

References

External links 

 
 [ Philippine Standard Geographic Code]
Philippine Census Information
NCC Website for Iriga City

 
Cities in Camarines Sur
Populated places established in 1683
1683 establishments in the Philippines
Component cities in the Philippines